The president of the United States (POTUS) is the head of state and head of government of the United States of America. The president directs the executive branch of the federal government and is the commander-in-chief of the United States Armed Forces.

The power of the presidency has grown substantially since the first president, George Washington, took office in 1789. While presidential power has ebbed and flowed over time, the presidency has played an increasingly significant role in American political life since the beginning of the 20th century, with notable expansion during the presidency of Franklin D. Roosevelt. In modern times, the president is one of the world's most powerful political figures – the leader of the only remaining global superpower. As the leader of the nation with the largest economy by nominal GDP, the president possesses significant domestic and international hard and soft power.

Article II of the Constitution establishes the executive branch of the federal government and vests executive power in the president. The power includes the execution and enforcement of federal law and the responsibility to appoint federal executive, diplomatic, regulatory, and judicial officers.  Based on constitutional provisions empowering the president to appoint and receive ambassadors and conclude treaties with foreign powers, and on subsequent laws enacted by Congress, the modern presidency has primary responsibility for conducting U.S. foreign policy. The role includes responsibility for directing the world's most expensive military, which has the second largest nuclear arsenal.

The president also plays a leading role in federal legislation and domestic policymaking. As part of the system of separation of powers, Article I, Section7 of the Constitution gives the president the power to sign or veto federal legislation.  Since modern presidents are typically viewed as leaders of their political parties, major policymaking is significantly shaped by the outcome of presidential elections, with presidents taking an active role in promoting their policy priorities to members of Congress who are often electorally dependent on the president. In recent decades, presidents have also made increasing use of executive orders, agency regulations, and judicial appointments to shape domestic policy.

The president is elected indirectly through the Electoral College to a four-year term, along with the vice president. Under the Twenty-second Amendment, ratified in 1951, no person who has been elected to two presidential terms may be elected to a third. In addition, nine vice presidents have become president by virtue of a president's intra-term death or resignation. In all, 45 individuals have served 46 presidencies spanning 58 full four-year terms. Joe Biden is the 46th and current president of the United States, having assumed office on January 20, 2021.

History and development

Origins 

In July 1776, during the American Revolutionary War, the Thirteen Colonies, acting jointly through the Second Continental Congress, declared themselves to be 13 independent sovereign states, no longer under British rule. Recognizing the necessity of closely coordinating their efforts against the British, the Continental Congress simultaneously began the process of drafting a constitution that would bind the states together. There were long debates on a number of issues, including representation and voting, and the exact powers to be given the central government. Congress finished work on the Articles of Confederation to establish a perpetual union between the states in November 1777 and sent it to the states for ratification.

Under the Articles, which took effect on March 1, 1781, the Congress of the Confederation was a central political authority without any legislative power. It could make its own resolutions, determinations, and regulations, but not any laws, and could not impose any taxes or enforce local commercial regulations upon its citizens. This institutional design reflected how Americans believed the deposed British system of Crown and Parliament ought to have functioned with respect to the royal dominion: a superintending body for matters that concerned the entire empire. The states were out from under any monarchy and assigned some formerly royal prerogatives (e.g., making war, receiving ambassadors, etc.) to Congress; the remaining prerogatives were lodged within their own respective state governments. The members of Congress elected a president of the United States in Congress Assembled to preside over its deliberation as a neutral discussion moderator. Unrelated to and quite dissimilar from the later office of president of the United States, it was a largely ceremonial position without much influence.

In 1783, the Treaty of Paris secured independence for each of the former colonies. With peace at hand, the states each turned toward their own internal affairs. By 1786, Americans found their continental borders besieged and weak and their respective economies in crises as neighboring states agitated trade rivalries with one another. They witnessed their hard currency pouring into foreign markets to pay for imports, their Mediterranean commerce preyed upon by North African pirates, and their foreign-financed Revolutionary War debts unpaid and accruing interest. Civil and political unrest loomed.  Events such as the Newburgh Conspiracy and Shays' Rebellion demonstrated that the Articles of Confederation were not working.

Following the successful resolution of commercial and fishing disputes between Virginia and Maryland at the Mount Vernon Conference in 1785, Virginia called for a trade conference between all the states, set for September 1786 in Annapolis, Maryland, with an aim toward resolving further-reaching interstate commercial antagonisms. When the convention failed for lack of attendance due to suspicions among most of the other states, Alexander Hamilton led the Annapolis delegates in a call for a convention to offer revisions to the Articles, to be held the next spring in Philadelphia. Prospects for the next convention appeared bleak until James Madison and Edmund Randolph succeeded in securing George Washington's attendance to Philadelphia as a delegate for Virginia.

When the Constitutional Convention convened in May 1787, the 12 state delegations in attendance (Rhode Island did not send delegates) brought with them an accumulated experience over a diverse set of institutional arrangements between legislative and executive branches from within their respective state governments. Most states maintained a weak executive without veto or appointment powers, elected annually by the legislature to a single term only, sharing power with an executive council, and countered by a strong legislature. New York offered the greatest exception, having a strong, unitary governor with veto and appointment power elected to a three-year term, and eligible for reelection to an indefinite number of terms thereafter. It was through the closed-door negotiations at Philadelphia that the presidency framed in the U.S. Constitution emerged.

1789–1933 

As the nation's first president, George Washington established many norms that would come to define the office.  His decision to retire after two terms helped address fears that the nation would devolve into monarchy, and established a precedent that would not be broken until 1940 and would eventually be made permanent by the Twenty-Second Amendment.  By the end of his presidency, political parties had developed, with John Adams defeating Thomas Jefferson in 1796, the first truly contested presidential election.  After Jefferson defeated Adams in 1800, he and his fellow Virginians James Madison and James Monroe would each serve two terms, eventually dominating the nation's politics during the Era of Good Feelings until Adams' son John Quincy Adams won election in 1824 after the Democratic-Republican Party split.

The election of Andrew Jackson in 1828 was a significant milestone, as Jackson was not part of the Virginia and Massachusetts elite that had held the presidency for its first 40 years. Jacksonian democracy sought to strengthen the presidency at the expense of Congress, while broadening public participation as the nation rapidly expanded westward. However, his successor, Martin Van Buren, became unpopular after the Panic of 1837, and the death of William Henry Harrison and subsequent poor relations between John Tyler and Congress led to further weakening of the office. Including Van Buren, in the 24 years between 1837 and 1861, six presidential terms would be filled by eight different men, with none serving two terms. The Senate played an important role during this period, with the Great Triumvirate of Henry Clay, Daniel Webster, and John C. Calhoun playing key roles in shaping national policy in the 1830s and 1840s until debates over slavery began pulling the nation apart in the 1850s.

Abraham Lincoln's leadership during the Civil War has led historians to regard him as one of the nation's greatest presidents. The circumstances of the war and Republican domination of Congress made the office very powerful, and Lincoln's re-election in 1864 was the first time a president had been re-elected since Jackson in 1832. After Lincoln's assassination, his successor Andrew Johnson lost all political support and was nearly removed from office, with Congress remaining powerful during the two-term presidency of Civil War general Ulysses S. Grant. After the end of Reconstruction, Grover Cleveland would eventually become the first Democratic president elected since before the war, running in three consecutive elections (1884, 1888, 1892) and winning twice. In 1900, William McKinley became the first incumbent to win re-election since Grant in 1872.

After McKinley's assassination, Theodore Roosevelt became a dominant figure in American politics. Historians believe Roosevelt permanently changed the political system by strengthening the presidency, with some key accomplishments including breaking up trusts, conservationism, labor reforms, making personal character as important as the issues, and hand-picking his successor, William Howard Taft. The following decade, Woodrow Wilson led the nation to victory during World War I, although Wilson's proposal for the League of Nations was rejected by the Senate.  Warren Harding, while popular in office, would see his legacy tarnished by scandals, especially Teapot Dome, and Herbert Hoover quickly became very unpopular after failing to alleviate the Great Depression.

Imperial Presidency 

The ascendancy of Franklin D. Roosevelt in 1933 led further toward what historians now describe as the Imperial Presidency. Backed by enormous Democratic majorities in Congress and public support for major change, Roosevelt's New Deal dramatically increased the size and scope of the federal government, including more executive agencies. The traditionally small presidential staff was greatly expanded, with the Executive Office of the President being created in 1939, none of whom require Senate confirmation. Roosevelt's unprecedented re-election to a third and fourth term, the victory of the United States in World War II, and the nation's growing economy all helped established the office as a position of global leadership. His successors, Harry Truman and Dwight D. Eisenhower, each served two terms as the Cold War led the presidency to be viewed as the "leader of the free world," while John F. Kennedy was a youthful and popular leader who benefitted from the rise of television in the 1960s.

After Lyndon B. Johnson lost popular support due to the Vietnam War and Richard Nixon's presidency collapsed in the Watergate scandal, Congress enacted a series of reforms intended to reassert itself. These included the War Powers Resolution, enacted over Nixon's veto in 1973, and the Congressional Budget and Impoundment Control Act of 1974 that sought to strengthen congressional fiscal powers. By 1976, Gerald Ford conceded that "the historic pendulum" had swung toward Congress, raising the possibility of a "disruptive" erosion of his ability to govern. Ford failed to win election to a full term and his successor, Jimmy Carter, failed to win re-election.  Ronald Reagan, who had been an actor before beginning his political career, used his talent as a communicator to help re-shape the American agenda away from New Deal policies toward more conservative ideology.

With the Cold War ending and the United States becoming the world's undisputed leading power, Bill Clinton, George W. Bush, and Barack Obama each served two terms as president. Meanwhile, Congress and the nation gradually became more politically polarized, especially following the 1994 mid-term elections that saw Republicans control the House for the first time in 40 years, and the rise of routine filibusters in the Senate in recent decades. Recent presidents have thus increasingly focused on executive orders, agency regulations, and judicial appointments to implement major policies, at the expense of legislation and congressional power. Presidential elections in the 21st century have reflected this continuing polarization, with no candidate except Obama in 2008 winning by more than five percent of the popular vote and two — George W. Bush and Donald Trump — winning in the Electoral College while losing the popular vote.  Both Clinton and Trump were impeached by a House controlled by the opposition party, but the impeachments did not appear to have long-term effects on their political standing.

Critics of presidency's evolution 

The nation's Founding Fathers expected the Congress—which was the first branch of government described in the Constitution—to be the dominant branch of government; they did not expect a strong executive department. However, presidential power has shifted over time, which has resulted in claims that the modern presidency has become too powerful, unchecked, unbalanced, and "monarchist" in nature. In 2008 Professor Dana D. Nelson expressed belief that presidents over the previous thirty years worked towards "undivided presidential control of the executive branch and its agencies". She criticized proponents of the Unitary executive theory for expanding "the many existing uncheckable executive powers—such as executive orders, decrees, memorandums, proclamations, national security directives and legislative signing statements—that already allow presidents to enact a good deal of foreign and domestic policy without aid, interference or consent from Congress". Bill Wilson, board member of Americans for Limited Government, opined that the expanded presidency was "the greatest threat ever to individual freedom and democratic rule".

Legislative powers 
Article I, Section1 of the Constitution vests all lawmaking power in Congress's hands, and Article 1, Section 6, Clause2 prevents the president (and all other executive branch officers) from simultaneously being a member of Congress. Nevertheless, the modern presidency exerts significant power over legislation, both due to constitutional provisions and historical developments over time.

Signing and vetoing bills 

The president's most significant legislative power derives from the Presentment Clause, which gives the president the power to veto any bill passed by Congress. While Congress can override a presidential veto, it requires a two-thirds vote of both houses, which is usually very difficult to achieve except for widely supported bipartisan legislation. The framers of the Constitution feared that Congress would seek to increase its power and enable a "tyranny of the majority," so giving the indirectly elected president a veto was viewed as an important check on the legislative power. While George Washington believed the veto should only be used in cases where a bill was unconstitutional, it is now routinely used in cases where presidents have policy disagreements with a bill.  The veto – or threat of a veto – has thus evolved to make the modern presidency a central part of the American legislative process.

Specifically, under the Presentment Clause, once a bill has been presented by Congress, the president has three options:
 Sign the legislation within ten days, excluding Sundays—the bill becomes law.
 Veto the legislation within the above timeframe and return it to the house of Congress from which it originated, expressing any objections—the bill does not become law, unless both houses of Congress vote to override the veto by a two-thirds vote.
 Take no action on the legislation within the above timeframe—the bill becomes law, as if the president had signed it, unless Congress is adjourned at the time, in which case it does not become law (a pocket veto).

In 1996, Congress attempted to enhance the president's veto power with the Line Item Veto Act. The legislation empowered the president to sign any spending bill into law while simultaneously striking certain spending items within the bill, particularly any new spending, any amount of discretionary spending, or any new limited tax benefit. Congress could then repass that particular item. If the president then vetoed the new legislation, Congress could override the veto by its ordinary means, a two-thirds vote in both houses. In Clinton v. City of New York, the U.S. Supreme Court ruled such a legislative alteration of the veto power to be unconstitutional.

Setting the agenda 

For most of American history, candidates for president have sought election on the basis of a promised legislative agenda. Formally, Article II, Section 3, Clause 2 requires the president to recommend such measures to Congress which the president deems "necessary and expedient". This is done through the constitutionally-based State of the Union address, which usually outlines the president's legislative proposals for the coming year, and through other formal and informal communications with Congress.

The president can be involved in crafting legislation by suggesting, requesting, or even insisting that Congress enact laws he believes are needed. Additionally, he can attempt to shape legislation during the legislative process by exerting influence on individual members of Congress. Presidents possess this power because the Constitution is silent about who can write legislation, but the power is limited because only members of Congress can introduce legislation.

The president or other officials of the executive branch may draft legislation and then ask senators or representatives to introduce these drafts into Congress. Additionally, the president may attempt to have Congress alter proposed legislation by threatening to veto that legislation unless requested changes are made.

Promulgating regulations 
Many laws enacted by Congress do not address every possible detail, and either explicitly or implicitly delegate powers of implementation to an appropriate federal agency. As the head of the executive branch, presidents control a vast array of agencies that can issue regulations with little oversight from Congress.

In the 20th century, critics charged that too many legislative and budgetary powers that should have belonged to Congress had slid into the hands of presidents. One critic charged that presidents could appoint a "virtual army of 'czars'—each wholly unaccountable to Congress yet tasked with spearheading major policy efforts for the White House". Presidents have been criticized for making signing statements when signing congressional legislation about how they understand a bill or plan to execute it. This practice has been criticized by the American Bar Association as unconstitutional. Conservative commentator George Will wrote of an "increasingly swollen executive branch" and "the eclipse of Congress".

Convening and adjourning Congress 

To allow the government to act quickly in case of a major domestic or international crisis arising when Congress is not in session, the president is empowered by Article II, Section3 of the Constitution to call a special session of one or both houses of Congress. Since John Adams first did so in 1797, the president has called the full Congress to convene for a special session on 27 occasions. Harry S. Truman was the most recent to do so in July 1948 (the so-called "Turnip Day Session"). In addition, prior to ratification of the Twentieth Amendment in 1933, which brought forward the date on which Congress convenes from December to January, newly inaugurated presidents would routinely call the Senate to meet to confirm nominations or ratify treaties. In practice, the power has fallen into disuse in the modern era as Congress now formally remains in session year-round, convening pro forma sessions every three days even when ostensibly in recess. Correspondingly, the president is authorized to adjourn Congress if the House and Senate cannot agree on the time of adjournment; no president has ever had to exercise this power.

Executive powers 

The president is head of the executive branch of the federal government and is constitutionally obligated to "take care that the laws be faithfully executed". The executive branch has over four million employees, including the military.

Administrative powers 

Presidents make Political appointments. An incoming president may make up to 4,000 upon taking office, 1200 of which must be confirmed by the U.S. Senate. Ambassadors, members of the Cabinet, and various officers, are among the positions filled by presidential appointment with Senate confirmation.

The power of a president to fire executive officials has long been a contentious political issue. Generally, a president may remove executive officials at will. However, Congress can curtail and constrain a president's authority to fire commissioners of independent regulatory agencies and certain inferior executive officers by statute.

To manage the growing federal bureaucracy, presidents have gradually surrounded themselves with many layers of staff, who were eventually organized into the Executive Office of the President of the United States. Within the Executive Office, the president's innermost layer of aides (and their assistants) are located in the White House Office.

The president also possesses the power to manage operations of the federal government by issuing various types of directives, such as presidential proclamation and executive orders. When the president is lawfully exercising one of the constitutionally conferred presidential responsibilities, the scope of this power is broad. Even so, these directives are subject to judicial review by U.S. federal courts, which can find them to be unconstitutional. Moreover, Congress can overturn an executive order via legislation (e.g., Congressional Review Act).

Foreign affairs 

Article II, Section 3, Clause 4 requires the president to "receive Ambassadors." This clause, known as the Reception Clause, has been interpreted to imply that the president possesses broad power over matters of foreign policy, and to provide support for the president's exclusive authority to grant recognition to a foreign government. The Constitution also empowers the president to appoint United States ambassadors, and to propose and chiefly negotiate agreements between the United States and other countries. Such agreements, upon receiving the advice and consent of the U.S. Senate (by a two-thirds majority vote), become binding with the force of federal law.

While foreign affairs has always been a significant element of presidential responsibilities, advances in technology since the Constitution's adoption have increased presidential power. Where formerly ambassadors were vested with significant power to independently negotiate on behalf of the United States, presidents now routinely meet directly with leaders of foreign countries.

Commander-in-chief 

One of the most important of executive powers is the president's role as commander-in-chief of the United States Armed Forces. The power to declare war is constitutionally vested in Congress, but the president has ultimate responsibility for the direction and disposition of the military. The exact degree of authority that the Constitution grants to the president as commander-in-chief has been the subject of much debate throughout history, with Congress at various times granting the president wide authority and at others attempting to restrict that authority. The framers of the Constitution took care to limit the president's powers regarding the military; Alexander Hamilton explained this in Federalist No. 69:

In the modern era, pursuant to the War Powers Resolution, Congress must authorize any troop deployments longer than 60 days, although that process relies on triggering mechanisms that have never been employed, rendering it ineffectual. Additionally, Congress provides a check to presidential military power through its control over military spending and regulation. Presidents have historically initiated the process for going to war, but critics have charged that there have been several conflicts in which presidents did not get official declarations, including Theodore Roosevelt's military move into Panama in 1903, the Korean War, the Vietnam War, and the invasions of Grenada in 1983 and Panama in 1989.

The amount of military detail handled personally by the president in wartime has varied greatly. George Washington, the first U.S. president, firmly established military subordination under civilian authority. In 1794, Washington used his constitutional powers to assemble 12,000 militia to quell the Whiskey Rebellion—a conflict in western Pennsylvania involving armed farmers and distillers who refused to pay an excise tax on spirits. According to historian Joseph Ellis, this was the "first and only time a sitting American president led troops in the field", though James Madison briefly took control of artillery units in defense of Washington, D.C., during the War of 1812. Abraham Lincoln was deeply involved in overall strategy and in day-to-day operations during the American Civil War, 1861–1865; historians have given Lincoln high praise for his strategic sense and his ability to select and encourage commanders such as Ulysses S. Grant. The present-day operational command of the Armed Forces is delegated to the Department of Defense and is normally exercised through the secretary of defense. The chairman of the Joint Chiefs of Staff and the Combatant Commands assist with the operation as outlined in the presidentially approved Unified Command Plan (UCP).

Juridical powers and privileges 

The president has the power to nominate federal judges, including members of the United States courts of appeals and the Supreme Court of the United States. However, these nominations require Senate confirmation before they may take office. Securing Senate approval can provide a major obstacle for presidents who wish to orient the federal judiciary toward a particular ideological stance. When nominating judges to U.S. district courts, presidents often respect the long-standing tradition of senatorial courtesy. Presidents may also grant pardons and reprieves. Gerald Ford pardoned Richard Nixon a month after taking office. Presidents often grant pardons shortly before leaving office, like when Bill Clinton pardoned Patty Hearst on his last day in office; this is often controversial.

Two doctrines concerning executive power have developed that enable the president to exercise executive power with a degree of autonomy. The first is executive privilege, which allows the president to withhold from disclosure any communications made directly to the president in the performance of executive duties. George Washington first claimed the privilege when Congress requested to see Chief Justice John Jay's notes from an unpopular treaty negotiation with Great Britain. While not enshrined in the Constitution or any other law, Washington's action created the precedent for the privilege. When Nixon tried to use executive privilege as a reason for not turning over subpoenaed evidence to Congress during the Watergate scandal, the Supreme Court ruled in United States v. Nixon, that executive privilege did not apply in cases where a president was attempting to avoid criminal prosecution. When Bill Clinton attempted to use executive privilege regarding the Lewinsky scandal, the Supreme Court ruled in Clinton v. Jones, that the privilege also could not be used in civil suits. These cases established the legal precedent that executive privilege is valid, although the exact extent of the privilege has yet to be clearly defined. Additionally, federal courts have allowed this privilege to radiate outward and protect other executive branch employees, but have weakened that protection for those executive branch communications that do not involve the president.

The state secrets privilege allows the president and the executive branch to withhold information or documents from discovery in legal proceedings if such release would harm national security. Precedent for the privilege arose early in the 19th century when Thomas Jefferson refused to release military documents in the treason trial of Aaron Burr and again in Totten v. United States , when the Supreme Court dismissed a case brought by a former Union spy. However, the privilege was not formally recognized by the U.S. Supreme Court until United States v. Reynolds , where it was held to be a common law evidentiary privilege. Before the September 11 attacks, use of the privilege had been rare, but increasing in frequency. Since 2001, the government has asserted the privilege in more cases and at earlier stages of the litigation, thus in some instances causing dismissal of the suits before reaching the merits of the claims, as in the Ninth Circuit's ruling in Mohamed v. Jeppesen Dataplan, Inc. Critics of the privilege claim its use has become a tool for the government to cover up illegal or embarrassing government actions.

The degree to which the president personally has absolute immunity from court cases is contested and has been the subject of several Supreme Court decisions. Nixon v. Fitzgerald (1982) dismissed a civil lawsuit against by-then former president Richard Nixon based on his official actions. Clinton v. Jones (1997) decided that a president has no immunity against civil suits for actions taken before becoming president, and ruled that a sexual harassment suit could proceed without delay, even against a sitting president. The 2019 Mueller report on Russian interference in the 2016 presidential election detailed evidence of possible obstruction of justice, but investigators declined to refer Donald Trump for prosecution based on a United States Department of Justice policy against indicting an incumbent president. The report noted that impeachment by Congress was available as a remedy. As of October 2019, a case was pending in the federal courts regarding access to personal tax returns in a criminal case brought against Donald Trump by the New York County District Attorney alleging violations of New York state law.

Leadership roles

Head of state 

As head of state, the president represents the United States government to its own people, and represents the nation to the rest of the world. For example, during a state visit by a foreign head of state, the president typically hosts a State Arrival Ceremony held on the South Lawn, a custom was begun by John F. Kennedy in 1961. This is followed by a state dinner given by the president which is held in the State Dining Room later in the evening.

As a national leader, the president also fulfills many less formal ceremonial duties. For example, William Howard Taft started the tradition of throwing out the ceremonial first pitch in 1910 at Griffith Stadium, Washington, D.C., on the Washington Senators's Opening Day. Every president since Taft, except for Jimmy Carter, threw out at least one ceremonial first ball or pitch for Opening Day, the All-Star Game, or the World Series, usually with much fanfare. Every president since Theodore Roosevelt has served as honorary president of the Boy Scouts of America.

Other presidential traditions are associated with American holidays. Rutherford B. Hayes began in 1878 the first White House egg rolling for local children. Beginning in 1947, during the Harry S. Truman administration, every Thanksgiving the president is presented with a live domestic turkey during the annual National Thanksgiving Turkey Presentation held at the White House. Since 1989, when the custom of "pardoning" the turkey was formalized by George H. W. Bush, the turkey has been taken to a farm where it will live out the rest of its natural life.

Presidential traditions also involve the president's role as head of government. Many outgoing presidents since James Buchanan traditionally give advice to their successor during the presidential transition. Ronald Reagan and his successors have also left a private message on the desk of the Oval Office on Inauguration Day for the incoming president.

The modern presidency holds the president as one of the nation's premier celebrities. Some argue that images of the presidency have a tendency to be manipulated by administration public relations officials as well as by presidents themselves. One critic described the presidency as "propagandized leadership" which has a "mesmerizing power surrounding the office". Administration public relations managers staged carefully crafted photo-ops of smiling presidents with smiling crowds for television cameras. One critic wrote the image of John F. Kennedy was described as carefully framed "in rich detail" which "drew on the power of myth" regarding the incident of PT 109 and wrote that Kennedy understood how to use images to further his presidential ambitions. As a result, some political commentators have opined that American voters have unrealistic expectations of presidents: voters expect a president to "drive the economy, vanquish enemies, lead the free world, comfort tornado victims, heal the national soul and protect borrowers from hidden credit-card fees".

Head of party 

The president is typically considered to be the head of their political party. Since the entire House of Representatives and at least one-third of the Senate is elected simultaneously with the president, candidates from a political party inevitably have their electoral success intertwined with the performance of the party's presidential candidate. The coattail effect, or lack thereof, will also often impact a party's candidates at state and local levels of government as well. However, there are often tensions between a president and others in the party, with presidents who lose significant support from their party's caucus in Congress generally viewed to be weaker and less effective.

Global leader 

With the rise of the United States as a superpower in the 20th century, and the United States having the world's largest economy into the 21st century, the president is typically viewed as a global leader, and at times the world's most powerful political figure. The position of the United States as the leading member of NATO, and the country's strong relationships with other wealthy or democratic nations like those comprising the European Union, have led to the moniker that the president is the "leader of the free world."

Selection process

Eligibility 

Article II, Section 1, Clause 5 of the Constitution sets three qualifications for holding the presidency. To serve as president, one must:
 be a natural-born citizen of the United States;
 be at least 35 years old;
 be a resident in the United States for at least 14 years.

A person who meets the above qualifications would, however, still be disqualified from holding the office of president under any of the following conditions:
 Under Article I, Section 3, Clause 7, having been impeached, convicted and disqualified from holding further public office, although there is some legal debate as to whether the disqualification clause also includes the presidential office: the only previous persons so punished were three federal judges.
 Under Section 3 of the Fourteenth Amendment, no person who swore an oath to support the Constitution, and later rebelled against the United States, is eligible to hold any office. However, this disqualification can be lifted by a two-thirds vote of each house of Congress. There is, again, some debate as to whether the clause as written allows disqualification from the presidential position, or whether it would first require litigation outside of Congress, although there is precedent for use of this amendment outside of the original intended purpose of excluding Confederates from public office after the Civil War.
 Under the Twenty-second Amendment, no person can be elected president more than twice. The amendment also specifies that if any eligible person serves as president or acting president for more than two years of a term for which some other eligible person was elected president, the former can only be elected president once.

Campaigns and nomination 

The modern presidential campaign begins before the primary elections, which the two major political parties use to clear the field of candidates before their national nominating conventions, where the most successful candidate is made the party's presidential nominee. Typically, the party's presidential candidate chooses a vice presidential nominee, and this choice is rubber-stamped by the convention. The most common previous profession of presidents is lawyer.

Nominees participate in nationally televised debates, and while the debates are usually restricted to the Democratic and Republican nominees, third party candidates may be invited, such as Ross Perot in the 1992 debates. Nominees campaign across the country to explain their views, convince voters and solicit contributions. Much of the modern electoral process is concerned with winning swing states through frequent visits and mass media advertising drives.

Election 

The president is elected indirectly by the voters of each state and the District of Columbia through the Electoral College, a body of electors formed every four years for the sole purpose of electing the president and vice president to concurrent four-year terms. As prescribed by Article II, Section 1, Clause 2, each state is entitled to a number of electors equal to the size of its total delegation in both houses of Congress. Additionally, the Twenty-third Amendment provides that the District of Columbia is entitled to the number it would have if it were a state, but in no case more than that of the least populous state. Currently, all states and the District of Columbia select their electors based on a popular election. In all but two states, the party whose presidential–vice presidential ticket receives a plurality of popular votes in the state has its entire slate of elector nominees chosen as the state's electors. Maine and Nebraska deviate from this  practice, awarding two electors to the statewide winner and one to the winner in each congressional district.

On the first Monday after the second Wednesday in December, about six weeks after the election, the electors convene in their respective state capitals (and in Washington, D.C.) to vote for president and, on a separate ballot, for vice president. They typically vote for the candidates of the party that nominated them. While there is no constitutional mandate or federal law requiring them to do so, the District of Columbia and 32 states have laws requiring that their electors vote for the candidates to whom they are pledged. The constitutionality of these laws was upheld in Chiafalo v. Washington (2020). Following the vote, each state then sends a certified record of their electoral votes to Congress. The votes of the electors are opened and counted during a joint session of Congress, held in the first week of January. If a candidate has received an absolute majority of electoral votes for president (currently 270 of 538), that person is declared the winner. Otherwise, the House of Representatives must meet to elect a president using a contingent election procedure in which representatives, voting by state delegation, with each state casting a single vote, choose between the top three electoral vote-getters for president. To win the presidency, a Candidate must receive the votes of an absolute majority of states (currently 26 of 50).

There have been two contingent presidential elections in the nation's history. A 73–73 electoral vote tie between Thomas Jefferson and fellow Democratic-Republican Aaron Burr in the election of 1800 necessitated the first. Conducted under the original procedure established by Article II, Section 1, Clause3 of the Constitution, which stipulates that if two or three persons received a majority vote and an equal vote, the House of Representatives would choose one of them for president; the  would become vice president. On February 17, 1801, Jefferson was elected president on the 36th ballot, and Burr elected vice president. Afterward, the system was overhauled through the Twelfth Amendment in time to be used in the 1804 election. A quarter-century later, the choice for president again devolved to the House when no candidate won an absolute majority of electoral votes (131 of 261) in the election of 1824. Under the Twelfth Amendment, the House was required to choose a president from among the top three electoral vote recipients: Andrew Jackson, John Quincy Adams, and William H. Crawford. Held February 9, 1825, this second and most recent contingent election resulted in John Quincy Adams being elected president on the first ballot.

Inauguration 

Pursuant to the Twentieth Amendment, the four-year term of office for both the president and the vice president begins at noon on January 20. The first presidential and vice presidential terms to begin on this date, known as Inauguration Day, were the second terms of President Franklin D. Roosevelt and Vice President John Nance Garner in 1937. Previously, Inauguration Day was on March 4. As a result of the date change, the first term (1933–37) of both men had been shortened by  days.

Before executing the powers of the office, a president is required to recite the presidential Oath of Office, found in Article II, Section 1, Clause8 of the Constitution. This is the only component in the inauguration ceremony mandated by the Constitution:

Presidents have traditionally placed one hand upon a Bible while taking the oath, and have added "So help me God" to the end of the oath. Although the oath may be administered by any person authorized by law to administer oaths, presidents are traditionally sworn in by the chief justice of the United States.

Incumbency

Term limit 

When the first president, George Washington, announced in his Farewell Address that he was not running for a third term, he established a "two terms then out" precedent. Precedent became tradition after Thomas Jefferson publicly embraced the principle a decade later during his second term, as did his two immediate successors, James Madison and James Monroe. In spite of the strong two-term tradition, Ulysses S. Grant sought nomination at the 1880 Republican National Convention for a non-consecutive third term, but was unsuccessful.

In 1940, after leading the nation through the Great Depression and focused on supporting U.S. allied nations at war with the Axis powers, Franklin Roosevelt was elected to a third term, breaking the long-standing precedent. Four years later, with the U.S. engaged in World War II, he was re-elected again despite his declining physical health; he died 82 days into his fourth term on April 12, 1945.

In response to the unprecedented length of Roosevelt's presidency, the Twenty-second Amendment was adopted in 1951. The amendment bars anyone from being elected president more than twice, or once if that person served more than two years (24 months) of another president's four-year term. Harry S. Truman, the president at the time it was submitted to the states by the Congress, was exempted from its limitations, and briefly sought a second full term—to which he would have otherwise been ineligible for re-election, as he had been president for more than two years of Roosevelt's fourth term—before he withdrew from the 1952 election. Since becoming operative in 1951, the amendment has been applicable to six twice-elected presidents: Dwight D. Eisenhower, Richard Nixon, Ronald Reagan, Bill Clinton, George W. Bush, and Barack Obama.

Vacancies and succession 

Under Section1 of the Twenty-fifth Amendment, ratified in 1967, the vice president becomes president upon the removal from office, death, or resignation of the president. Deaths have occurred a number of times, resignation has occurred only once, and removal from office has never occurred.

The original Constitution, in Article II, Section 1, Clause 6, stated only that the vice president assumes the "powers and duties" of the presidency in the event of a president's removal, death, resignation, or inability. Under this clause, there was ambiguity about whether the vice president would actually become president in the event of a vacancy, or simply act as president, potentially resulting in a special election. Upon the death of William Henry Harrison in 1841, Vice President John Tyler declared that he had succeeded to the office itself, refusing to accept any papers addressed to the "Acting President," and Congress ultimately accepted it. This established a precedent for future successions, although it was not formally clarified until the Twenty-fifth Amendment was ratified.

In the event of a double vacancy, Article II, Section 1, Clause 6 also authorizes Congress to declare who shall become acting president in the "Case of Removal, Death, Resignation or Inability, both of the president and vice president". The Presidential Succession Act of 1947 (codified as ) provides that if both the president and vice president have left office or are both otherwise unavailable to serve during their terms of office, the presidential line of succession follows the order of: speaker of the House, then, if necessary, the president pro tempore of the Senate, and then if necessary, the eligible heads of federal executive departments who form the president's cabinet. The cabinet currently has 15 members, of which the secretary of state is first in line; the other Cabinet secretaries follow in the order in which their department (or the department of which their department is the successor) was created. Those individuals who are constitutionally ineligible to be elected to the presidency are also disqualified from assuming the powers and duties of the presidency through succession. No statutory successor has yet been called upon to act as president.

Declarations of inability 

Under the Twenty-fifth Amendment, the president may temporarily transfer the presidential powers and duties to the vice president, who then becomes acting president, by transmitting to the speaker of the House and the president pro tempore of the Senate a statement that he is unable to discharge his duties. The president resumes his or her powers upon transmitting a second declaration stating that he is again able. The mechanism has been used by Ronald Reagan (once), George W. Bush (twice), and Joe Biden (once), each in anticipation of surgery.

The Twenty-fifth Amendment also provides that the vice president, together with a majority of certain members of the Cabinet, may transfer the presidential powers and duties to the vice president by transmitting a written declaration, to the speaker of the House and the president pro tempore of the Senate, to the effect that the president is unable to discharge his or her powers and duties. If the president then declares that no such inability exist, he or she resumes the presidential powers unless the vice president and Cabinet make a second declaration of presidential inability, in which case Congress decides the question.

Removal 

Article II, Section 4 of the Constitution allows for the removal of high federal officials, including the president, from office for "treason, bribery, or other high crimes and misdemeanors". Article I, Section 2, Clause5 authorizes the House of Representatives to serve as a "grand jury" with the power to impeach said officials by a majority vote. Article I, Section 3, Clause6 authorizes the Senate to serve as a court with the power to remove impeached officials from office, by a two-thirds vote to convict.

Three presidents have been impeached by the House of Representatives: Andrew Johnson in 1868, Bill Clinton in 1998, and Donald Trump in 2019 and 2021; none have been convicted by the Senate. Additionally, the House Judiciary Committee conducted an impeachment inquiry against Richard Nixon in 1973–74 and reported  three articles of impeachment to the House of Representatives for final action; however, he resigned from office before the House voted on them.

Circumvention of authority 

Controversial measures have sometimes been taken short of removal to deal with perceived recklessness on the part of the President, or with a long-term disability. In some cases, staff have intentionally failed to deliver messages to or from the President, typically to avoid executing or promoting the President to write certain orders. This has ranged from Richard Nixon's Chief of Staff not transmitting orders to the Cabinet due to the President's heavy drinking, to staff removing memos from Donald Trump's desk. Decades before the Twenty-fifth Amendment, in 1919, President Woodrow Wilson had a stroke that left him partly incapacitated.  First lady Edith Wilson kept this condition a secret from the public for a while, and controversially became the sole gatekeeper for access to the President (aside from his doctor), assisting him with paperwork and deciding which information was "important" enough to share with him.

Compensation 

Since 2001, the president's annual salary has been $400,000, along with a: $50,000 expense allowance; $100,000 nontaxable travel account, and $19,000 entertainment account. The president's salary is set by Congress, and under Article II, Section 1, Clause7 of the Constitution, any increase or reduction in presidential salary cannot take effect before the next presidential term of office.

Residence 

The White House in Washington, D.C. is the official residence of the president. The site was selected by George Washington, and the cornerstone was laid in 1792. Every president since John Adams (in 1800) has lived there. At various times in U.S. history, it has been known as the "President's Palace", the "President's House", and the "Executive Mansion". Theodore Roosevelt officially gave the White House its current name in 1901. The federal government pays for state dinners and other official functions, but the president pays for personal, family, and guest dry cleaning and food.

Camp David, officially titled Naval Support Facility Thurmont, a mountain-based military camp in Frederick County, Maryland, is the president's country residence. A place of solitude and tranquility, the site has been used extensively to host foreign dignitaries since the 1940s.

President's Guest House, located next to the Eisenhower Executive Office Building at the White House Complex and Lafayette Park, serves as the president's official guest house and as a secondary residence for the president if needed. Four interconnected, 19th-century houses—Blair House, Lee House, and 700 and 704 Jackson Place—with a combined floor space exceeding  comprise the property.

Travel 

The primary means of long-distance air travel for the president is one of two identical Boeing VC-25 aircraft, which are extensively modified Boeing 747 airliners and are referred to as Air Force One while the president is on board (although any U.S. Air Force aircraft the president is aboard is designated as "Air Force One" for the duration of the flight). In-country trips are typically handled with just one of the two planes, while overseas trips are handled with both, one primary and one backup. The president also has access to smaller Air Force aircraft, most notably the Boeing C-32, which are used when the president must travel to airports that cannot support a jumbo jet. Any civilian aircraft the president is aboard is designated Executive One for the flight.

For short-distance air travel, the president has access to a fleet of U.S. Marine Corps helicopters of varying models, designated Marine One when the president is aboard any particular one in the fleet. Flights are typically handled with as many as five helicopters all flying together and frequently swapping positions as to disguise which helicopter the president is actually aboard to any would-be threats.

For ground travel, the president uses the presidential state car, which is an armored limousine designed to look like a Cadillac sedan, but built on a truck chassis. The U.S. Secret Service operates and maintains the fleet of several limousines. The president also has access to two armored motorcoaches, which are primarily used for touring trips.

Protection 

The U.S. Secret Service is charged with protecting the president and the first family. As part of their protection, presidents, first ladies, their children and other immediate family members, and other prominent persons and locations are assigned Secret Service codenames. The use of such names was originally for security purposes and dates to a time when sensitive electronic communications were not routinely encrypted; today, the names simply serve for purposes of brevity, clarity, and tradition.

Post-presidency

Activities 
Some former presidents have had significant careers after leaving office. Prominent examples include William Howard Taft's tenure as chief justice of the United States and Herbert Hoover's work on government reorganization after World War II. Grover Cleveland, whose bid for reelection failed in 1888, was elected president again four years later in 1892. Two former presidents served in Congress after leaving the White House: John Quincy Adams was elected to the House of Representatives, serving there for 17 years, and Andrew Johnson returned to the Senate in 1875, though he died soon after. Some ex-presidents were very active, especially in international affairs, most notably Theodore Roosevelt; Herbert Hoover; Richard Nixon; and Jimmy Carter.

Presidents may use their predecessors as emissaries to deliver private messages to other nations or as official representatives of the United States to state funerals and other important foreign events. Richard Nixon made multiple foreign trips to countries including China and Russia and was lauded as an elder statesman. Jimmy Carter has become a global human rights campaigner, international arbiter, and election monitor, as well as a recipient of the Nobel Peace Prize. Bill Clinton has also worked as an informal ambassador, most recently in the negotiations that led to the release of two American journalists, Laura Ling and Euna Lee, from North Korea. During his presidency, George W. Bush called on former Presidents Bush and Clinton to assist with humanitarian efforts after the 2004 Indian Ocean earthquake and tsunami. President Obama followed suit by asking Presidents Clinton and Bush to lead efforts to aid Haiti after an earthquake devastated that country in 2010.

Clinton was active politically since his presidential term ended, working with his wife Hillary on her 2008 and 2016 presidential bids and President Obama on his 2012 reelection campaign. Obama was also active politically since his presidential term ended, having worked with his former vice president Joe Biden on his 2020 election campaign. Trump has continued to make appearances in the media and at conventions and rallies since leaving office.

Pension and other benefits 

The Former Presidents Act (FPA), enacted in 1958, grants lifetime benefits to former presidents and their widows, including a monthly pension, medical care in military facilities, health insurance, and Secret Service protection; also provided is funding for a certain number of staff and for office expenses.  The act has been amended several times to provide increases in presidential pensions and in the allowances for office staff.  The FPA excludes any president who was removed from office by impeachment.

According to a 2008 report by the Congressional Research service:
Chief executives leaving office prior to 1958 often entered retirement pursuing various occupations and received no federal assistance. When industrialist Andrew Carnegie announced a plan in 1912 to offer $25,000 annual pensions to former Presidents, many Members of Congress deemed it inappropriate that such a pension would be provided by a private corporation executive. That same year, legislation was first introduced to create presidential pensions, but it was not enacted. In 1955, such legislation was considered by Congress because of former President Harry S. Truman’s financial limitations in hiring an office staff

The pension has increased numerous times with congressional approval. Retired presidents receive a pension based on the salary of the current administration's cabinet secretaries, which was $199,700 per year in 2012. Former presidents who served in Congress may also collect congressional pensions. The act also provides former presidents with travel funds and franking privileges.

Prior to 1997, all former presidents, their spouses, and their children until age 16 were protected by the Secret Service until the president's death. In 1997, Congress passed legislation limiting Secret Service protection to no more than 10 years from the date a president leaves office. On January 10, 2013, President Obama signed legislation reinstating lifetime Secret Service protection for him, George W. Bush, and all subsequent presidents. A first spouse who remarries is no longer eligible for Secret Service protection.

Presidential libraries 

Every president since Herbert Hoover has created a repository known as a presidential library for preserving and making available his papers, records, and other documents and materials. Completed libraries are deeded to and maintained by the National Archives and Records Administration (NARA); the initial funding for building and equipping each library must come from private, non-federal sources. There are currently thirteen presidential libraries in the NARA system. There are also presidential libraries maintained by state governments and private foundations and Universities of Higher Education, such as:
 the Abraham Lincoln Presidential Library and Museum, which is run by the State of Illinois; 
 the George W. Bush Presidential Library and Museum, which is run by Southern Methodist University; 
 the George H. W. Bush Presidential Library and Museum, which is run by Texas A&M University; and
 the Lyndon Baines Johnson Presidential Library and Museum, which is run by the University of Texas at Austin.

Several former presidents have overseen the building and opening of their own presidential libraries. Some have even made arrangements for their own burial at the site. Several presidential libraries contain the graves of the president they document: 
 the Harry S. Truman Presidential Library and Museum in Independence, Missouri; 
 the Dwight D. Eisenhower Presidential Library, Museum and Boyhood Home in Abilene, Kansas; 
 the Richard Nixon Presidential Library and Museum in Yorba Linda, California; and 
 the Ronald Reagan Presidential Library and Museum in Simi Valley, California. 
These gravesites are open to the general public.

Political affiliation 

Political parties have dominated American politics for most of the nation's history. Though the Founding Fathers generally spurned political parties as divisive and disruptive, and their rise had not been anticipated when the U.S. Constitution was drafted in 1787, organized political parties developed in the U.S. in the mid-1790s nonetheless. They evolved from political factions, which began to appear almost immediately after the Federal government came into existence. Those who supported the Washington administration were referred to as "pro-administration" and would eventually form the Federalist Party, while those in opposition joined the emerging Democratic-Republican Party.

Greatly concerned about the very real capacity of political parties to destroy the fragile unity holding the nation together, Washington remained unaffiliated with any political faction or party throughout his eight-year presidency. He was, and remains, the only U.S. president never to be affiliated with a political party. Since Washington, every U.S. president has been affiliated with a political party at the time of assuming office.

The number of presidents per political party at the time they were sworn into office (arranged in alphabetical order by last name) are:

Timeline of presidents 

The following timeline depicts the progression of the presidents and their political affiliation at the time of assuming office.

See also 
 Outline of American politics

Notes

References

Further reading 

 Ayton, Mel   Plotting to Kill the President: Assassination Attempts from Washington to Hoover (Potomac Books, 2017), United States
 Balogh, Brian and Bruce J. Schulman, eds. Recapturing the Oval Office: New Historical Approaches to the American Presidency (Cornell University Press, 2015), 311 pp.
 
 Lang, J. Stephen. The Complete Book of Presidential Trivia. Pelican Publishing. 2001. 
 Graff, Henry F., ed. The Presidents: A Reference History (3rd ed. 2002) online, short scholarly biographies from George Washington to William Clinton.
 Greenberg, David. Republic of Spin: An Inside History of the American Presidency (W. W. Norton & Company, 2015). xx, 540 pp. bibliography
 Han, Lori Cox. The Presidency (ABC-CLIO, 2021). wide-ranging reference book.
 Han, Lori Cox, ed. Hatred of America's Presidents: Personal Attacks on the White House from Washington to Trump (ABC-CLIO, 2018).
 Holzer, Harold. The Presidents Vs. the Press: The Endless Battle Between the White House and the Media--from the Founding Fathers to Fake News (Dutton, 2020) chapters on 20 presidencies
online 

 Hopper, Jennifer Rose. "Reexamining the Nineteenth-Century Presidency and Partisan Press: The Case of President Grant and the Whiskey Ring Scandal." Social Science History 42.1 (2018): 109–133.
 Leo, Leonard—Taranto, James—Bennett, William J. Presidential Leadership: Rating the Best and the Worst in the White House. Simon and Schuster. 2004. 
 Marshall, Jon. Clash: Presidents and the Press in Times of Crisis (U of Nebraska Press, 2022).
 Shade, William G. and Ballard Campbell, eds. American Presidential Campaigns and Elections (2003)
 
 Tebbel, John William, and Sarah Miles Watts. The Press and the Presidency: From George Washington to Ronald Reagan (Oxford University Press, 1985). online review
 Waterman, Richard W., and Robert Wright. The image-is-everything presidency: Dilemmas in American leadership (Routledge, 2018).
 Presidential Studies Quarterly, published by Wiley, is a quarterly academic journal on the presidency.

Historiography and memory 
 Greenstein, Fred I. et al. Evolution of the Modern President: A Bibliographical Survey (1977) annotated bibliography of 2500 scholarly articles and books covering each president. online

Primary sources 
 Waldman, Michael—Stephanopoulos, George. My Fellow Americans: The Most Important Speeches of America's Presidents, from George Washington to George W. Bush. Sourcebooks Trade. 2003. .

External links

 White House homepage
 United States Presidents Collection. General Collection, Beinecke Rare Book and Manuscript Library.

 
 
 
1789 establishments in the United States
Articles which contain graphical timelines